Port Stephens is a settlement and a harbour on West Falkland, in the Falkland Islands. It is on the far southwest of the island, near Calm Head and Cape Meredith and South Harbour is the nearest other settlement. Until recently, it was one of the Falkland Island Company's largest sheep stations. In 1989 the Company split the farm into five units which were all bought by former employees.  Port Stephens is one of the five sections of the original Port Stephens farm and is owned by Peter and Ann Robertson. While the harbour itself is sheltered, the surrounding area is frequently battered by Antarctic storms. The location is highly rugged, and considered to be amongst the most scenic in the Falklands. There is a self-catering cottage at Port Stephens with access to penguin colonies.

It was one of the few settlements that were not visited or garrisoned by the Argentine military in the Falklands War.

Nearby, thousands of birds, including rockhoppers and cormorants, breed on the coast.

References

Populated places on West Falkland